Marsaskala, also written as Marsascala and abbreviated as M'Skala, is a seaside town in the South Eastern Region of Malta which has grown around the small harbour at the head of Marsaskala Bay, a long, narrow inlet also known as Marsaskala Creek. The bay is sheltered to the north by Ras iż-Żonqor, the southeast corner of Malta, and to the south by the headland of Ras il-Gżira. The parish church, built in 1953, is dedicated to Saint Anne and the feast is celebrated at the end of July in Marsaskala.

It was originally a fishing village only but has gradually evolved into a tourist destination and a permanent hometown for an ever-growing population. The town has a winter population of 12,134 people as of March 2014, but swells to around 20,000 in summer.

Etymology 
Different opinions exist regarding the origin of the name Marsaskala. While it is commonly agreed that Marsa is an Arabic word meaning bay, Skala has given rise to different interpretations. Maybe it was derived from the Sicilian 'Piccola Cala' meaning little inlet or it was just a reference to some rock-cut steps on the water's edge since scala also means a straight flight of steps.

Marsaskala is better known as Wied il-Għajn by the Maltese as the bay and the old small village are flanked by two valleys, through which a spring of fresh water used to flow down into the innermost bay. Wied means valley and Għajn (pronounced ayn) refers to the spring of fresh water. Literally, Wied il-Għajn means Valley of the Spring.

History 

Humans inhabited the area since pre-history, as evidenced by a number of archaeological remains. Some of the ancient remains are the cart-ruts, which are parallel channels formed in the rock.

Early Christian catacombs, as well as Roman remains, were discovered in Marsaskala, the latter suggesting that Marsaskala was also a Roman port. Remains of Roman baths were found in a field at il-Gżira, a rock peninsula behind the Jerma Palace Hotel.

In 1614, 60 Ottoman ships carrying 6000 soldiers landed at Marsaskala and launched an attack on the south of Malta. Although the battle was a decisive Maltese victory, it brought back fear and terrifying memories of the Great Siege of Malta. Marsaskala's vulnerability to seaborne attacks was reduced by the building of Saint Thomas Tower in late 1565. The tower was financed by Grand Master Alof de Wignacourt and is one of a series of his towers. St. Thomas Tower continued to be used for military purposes until the 19th century and it has been recently restored.

In 1659, Żonqor Tower, one of the 13 De Redin towers was built in the area. This tower was demolished in 1915 by British military engineers. No traces of it can be seen anymore and a pillbox now stands in its place. Marsaskala has various other towers, but these were built privately by wealthy residents as fortified houses. These include Mamo Tower, Tal-Buttar Tower and Tal-Gardiel Tower.

In 1715, Briconet Redoubt was built by the Order and it is now well preserved and is used as a police station. A second redoubt was built close to Marsaskala but it was destroyed in 1915.

In 1882, the British built Żonqor Battery which saw little use as it was unsuitable for proper defence.

In 2003, American amateur pseudo-archaeologist Bob Cornuke caused a controversy with sweeping statements written in his book The Lost Shipwreck of St. Paul, where he claimed that Paul the Apostle had been shipwrecked in St Thomas' Bay, in Marsaskala. His claim was never confirmed and discredited by those related in the field, although St. Thomas' Bay and other Mediterranean bays match the limited description found in the 27th chapter of the book of Acts: a sandy beach, rocky shoreline, deep water (about 90-foot depth) relatively close to shore, and the discovery of four identical Roman ship anchors found in the bay during the 1960s, now in the Malta Maritime Museum.

As a monument over the more recent Maltese history are the remains of the previous four-star Corinthia Jerma Palace Hotel at the very tip of mainland Ras il-Gżira. The hotel was owned by Libyan Arab Foreign Investment Company for 25 years and was closed in March 2007.

Government 

The first council in Marsaskala was formed in April 1994. The first mayor was also Malta's first female mayor, Marvic Attard Gialanze.

The main issue in this election was the controversial proposal of the building of a new waste recycling plant and a number of biogas tanks in Sant' Antnin Valley. This development was disputed by a committee composed of seven Labour local councils (including Marsaskala) and eight local non-government organisations. The matter was raised in the European Parliament.

Prime Minister Robert Abela, former President George Abela, former Prime Minister Lawrence Gonzi and two Labour Members of Parliament, Owen Bonnici and Helena Dalli live in the Marsaskala area, as does the leader of the defunct party Azzjoni Nazzjonali, Josie Muscat.

Geography 

The town of Marsaskala is located in the southeast of Malta, around the small harbour at the head of Marsaskala Bay, a long narrow inlet also known as Marsaskala Creek. The bay is sheltered to the north by Ras iż-Żonqor, the south-east corner of Malta, and to the south by the headland of Ras il-Gżira.

The town itself is located along both sides of the bay, and across most of Il-Ħamrija, a creek leading to Il-Ponta tal-Gżira. The shore north of Ras iż-Żonqor is of low cliffs, with shelving rock ledges south of the point. Marsaskala Bay is largely edged by promenade, with low shelving rock ledges cut with salt pans on the seaward face of Ras iċ-Ċerna, which continue on round the eastern point, past l-Abjad iż-Żgħir, and into St. Thomas' Bay to the south.

Sports 
The main sports in Marsaskala are football and waterpolo. Marsaskala F.C. are a football club founded in 2010.

Marsaskala Sports Club, founded in 1927, and re-founded in 1974 is one of the oldest waterpolo clubs in Malta.  Having languished in the second division for many years, Marsaskala Sports Club established themselves as one of Malta's top teams in the mid-nineties. In 1997 they were crowned Malta champions, the only season the trophy was won by a club from southern Malta.  They have represented Malta in the Ligue Européenne de Natation (LEN) Trophy in Chios, Greece in 1997 and the European Champions Cup in 1998 in Ústí nad Labem, Czech Republic, becoming the first Maltese team to win two European Champions Cup matches, against Swiss champions Horgen and the hosts themselves.

Several Marsaskala Sports Club products have also played with distinction in the national team, amongst of which were Charles Flask, Alfred Xuereb il-Yogi, Charles Żammit, Joseph Caruana Dingli, Anton Privitera, Paul Privitera and John Licari.  Both Joseph Caruana Dingli and Paul Privitera have also captained the Malta national team on many occasions.

Marsaskala was also the venue of the 2005 European Eight-ball Pool Championships and the European Darts Championships, both held at the Jerma Palace Hotel.

Marsaskala is popular with divers and swimmers.

Twin towns – sister cities

Marsaskala is a member of the Douzelage, a unique town twinning association of towns across the European Union. This active town twinning began in 1991 and Marsaskala joined in 2009. There are regular events, such as a produce market from each of the other countries and festivals.

 Agros, Cyprus
 Altea, Spain
 Asikkala, Finland
 Bad Kötzting, Germany
 Bellagio, Italy
 Bundoran, Ireland
 Chojna, Poland
 Dujiangyan, China
 Granville, France
 Holstebro, Denmark
 Houffalize, Belgium
 Judenburg, Austria
 Kőszeg, Hungary
 Meerssen, Netherlands
 Niederanven, Luxembourg
 Oxelösund, Sweden
 Preveza, Greece
 Rokiškis, Lithuania
 Rovinj, Croatia
 Sesimbra, Portugal
 Sherborne, United Kingdom
 Sigulda, Latvia
 Siret, Romania
 Škofja Loka, Slovenia
 Sušice, Czech Republic
 Tryavna, Bulgaria
 Türi, Estonia
 Zvolen, Slovakia

Marsaskala main roads

Triq Ħaż-Żabbar (Zabbar Road)
Triq id-Daħla ta' San Tumas (St Thomas Bay Road)
Triq il-Qaliet (Qaliet Street)
Triq is-Salini (Salini Street)
Triq ix-Xatt (Marina Street) - 3, Triq ix-Xatt
Triq iż-Żonqor (Zonqor Road)
Triq La Sengle (La Sengle Street)
Triq San Ġużepp (St Joseph Street)
Triq San Luqa (St Luke Street)
Triq Sant' Anna (St Anne Street)
Triq Sant' Antnin (Sant' Antnin Road)
Triq Tal-Gardiel (Tal-Gardiel Road)

References

External links 

 Marsaskala Local Council
 Marsaskala Parish
  Local Zonqor area site

 
Towns in Malta
Local councils of Malta